Cutler is a community and census-designated place (CDP) in Tulare County, California, United States. The population was 5,000 at the 2010 census, up from 4,491 at the 2000 census. The population as of 2019 was 5,214.

Geography
Cutler is located at  (36.524791, -119.288991).

Cutler is located by the junction of routes 63 and 201.

Cutler is nestled near the base of the Sierra Nevada Mountain Foothills.

Demographics

2010
The 2010 United States Census reported that Cutler had a population of 5,000. The racial makeup of Cutler was 2,421 (48.4%) White, 50 (1.0%) African American, 53 (1.1%) Native American, 64 (1.3%) Asian, 1 (0.0%) Pacific Islander, 2,241 (44.8%) from other races, and 170 (3.4%) from two or more races. Hispanic or Latino of any race were 4,829 persons (96.6%).

The Census reported that 5,000 people (100% of the population) lived in households, 0 (0%) lived in non-institutionalized group quarters, and 0 (0%) were institutionalized.

There were 1,085 households, out of which 729 (67.2%) had children under the age of 18 living in them, 651 (60.0%) were opposite-sex married couples living together, 190 (17.5%) had a female householder with no husband present, 141 (13.0%) had a male householder with no wife present.  There were 114 (10.5%) unmarried opposite-sex partnerships, and 7 (0.6%) same-sex married couples or partnerships. 65 households (6.0%) were made up of individuals, and 28 (2.6%) had someone living alone who was 65 years of age or older. The average household size was 4.61.  There were 982 families (90.5% of all households); the average family size was 4.55.

The population was spread out, with 1,859 people (37.2%) under the age of 18, 681 people (13.6%) aged 18 to 24, 1,376 people (27.5%) aged 25 to 44, 826 people (16.5%) aged 45 to 64, and 258 people (5.2%) who were 65 years of age or older.  The median age was 24.6 years. For every 100 females, there were 113.9 males.  For every 100 females age 18 and over, there were 119.8 males.

The homeowner vacancy rate was 1.0%; the rental vacancy rate was 4.0%.  2,137 people (42.7% of the population) lived in owner-occupied housing units and 2,863 people (57.3%) lived in rental housing units.

2000
As of the census of 2000, there were 4,491 people, 909 households, and 826 families residing in the CDP. The racial makeup of the CDP was 34.45% White, 0.38% African American, 1.18% Native American, 0.82% Asian, 58.63% from other races, and 4.54% from two or more races. Hispanic or Latino of any race were 96.24% of the population.

There were 909 households, out of which 60.1% had children under the age of 18 living with them, 63.1% were married couples living together, 17.3% had a female householder with no husband present, and 9.1% were non-families. 5.1% of all households were made up of individuals, and 3.0% had someone living alone who was 65 years of age or older.  The average household size was 4.94 and the average family size was 4.81.

In the CDP, the population was spread out, with 37.4% under the age of 18, 15.7% from 18 to 24, 29.0% from 25 to 44, 13.0% from 45 to 64, and 4.9% who were 65 years of age or older.  The median age was 24 years. For every 100 females, there were 126.5 males.  For every 100 females age 18 and over, there were 131.4 males.

The median income for a household in the CDP was $24,330, and the median income for a family was $24,432. Males had a median income of $18,250 versus $16,622 for females. The per capita income for the CDP was $6,254.  About 33.2% of families and 39.1% of the population were below the poverty line, including 51.2% of those under age 18 and 35.7% of those age 65 or over.

Cutler much like many communities in the Central Valley experienced an influx of immigrants from Mexico over the past 50 years. Where once it was an Anglo dominated community is now primarily a Hispanic dominated community. The larger populations from Mexico that encompass the community derive from Michoacan, Zacatecas and Nuevo Leon with a smaller population deriving from Sinaloa. Filipinos have also made their presence felt as they have added their rich culture to both communities of Cutler-Orosi. Filipinos along with their distinct dialect of Ilocano and Tagalog have introduced their rich foods such as Lumpia, Adobo, and Lechon to name a few.

Government

In the United States House of Representatives, Cutler is in

References

Census-designated places in Tulare County, California
Census-designated places in California